The Space Barons: Elon Musk, Jeff Bezos, and the Quest to Colonize the Cosmos is a 2018 book by Christian Davenport.  It covers the rise of the commercial space companies Blue Origin, led by Amazon founder Jeff Bezos, and SpaceX, led by PayPal and Tesla Motors founder Elon Musk.

References

2018 non-fiction books
Works about space programs
PublicAffairs books
SpaceX
Blue Origin